In probability theory, Bernstein inequalities give bounds on the probability that the sum of random variables deviates from its mean. In the simplest case, let X1, ..., Xn be independent Bernoulli random variables taking values +1 and −1 with probability 1/2 (this distribution is also known as the Rademacher distribution), then for every positive ,

Bernstein inequalities were proven and published by Sergei Bernstein in the 1920s and 1930s. Later, these inequalities were rediscovered several times in various forms. Thus, special cases of the Bernstein inequalities are also known as the Chernoff bound, Hoeffding's inequality and Azuma's inequality.

Some of the inequalities
1. Let  be independent zero-mean random variables. Suppose that  almost surely, for all  Then, for all positive ,

2. Let  be independent zero-mean random variables. Suppose that for some positive real  and every integer ,

Then

3. Let  be independent zero-mean random variables. Suppose that

for all integer  Denote

Then,

4. Bernstein also proved generalizations of the inequalities above to weakly dependent random variables. For example, inequality (2) can be extended as follows. Let  be possibly non-independent random variables. Suppose that for all integers ,

Then

More general results for martingales can be found in  Fan et al. (2015).

Proofs

The proofs are based on an application of Markov's inequality to the random variable

for a suitable choice of the parameter .

Generalizations
The Bernstein inequality could be generalized to Gaussian random matrices. The vector  is a Gaussian vector of size . Then for any , we have

where  is the vectorization operation. The proof is detailed in here. Another similar inequality is also formulated as

See also
Concentration inequality - a summary of tail-bounds on random variables.
Hoeffding's inequality

References

(according to: S.N.Bernstein, Collected Works, Nauka, 1964)

A modern translation of some of these results can also be found in 

Probabilistic inequalities